Margaret "Meg" Elizabeth Stone (née Ritchie, born 6 July 1952) is a retired Scottish discus thrower and Shot putter. She reached the Olympic finals at discus in Moscow 1980 (9th) and Los Angeles 1984 (5th). She also won the 1982 Commonwealth Games title. Her discus best of 67.48 metres has stood as the British record since 1981, while her shot put best of 18.99 metres has stood as the Scottish record since 1983.

Career
Born in Kirkcaldy, Fife, Ritchie won the Scottish championships in discus seven times and in shot put she won three Scottish titles. She also won the UK Championships four times in the discus, and three AAA discus titles. This is the current NCAA Women's Outdoor Track and Field and British record. In 1982 she won the NCAA Division 1 Championships shot/discus double in America. Later that same year she won the discus gold medal at the 1982 Commonwealth Games in Brisbane.

This is the current Scottish national record

Ritchie is married to Dr. Michael H. Stone. She is the Director of East Tennessee State University Sports Performance Enhancement Consortium (SPEC), the Director of the Center of Excellence for Coach Education, and Assistant Coach for Men's and Women's Track and Field at ETSU (Throws). Under her tutelage, the male throwers from ETSU have proceeded to break the indoor shot, discus, hammer, 35 lb weight, and outdoor shot school records. The women have set new records in the 20 lb weight throw and the hammer throw.

International competitions

References

External links
 
 Profile at Sporting Heroes
 

1952 births
Living people
Sportspeople from Kirkcaldy
British female discus throwers
British female shot putters
Scottish female shot putters
Scottish female discus throwers
Olympic athletes of Great Britain
Athletes (track and field) at the 1984 Summer Olympics
Athletes (track and field) at the 1980 Summer Olympics
Commonwealth Games gold medallists for Scotland
Commonwealth Games medallists in athletics
Athletes (track and field) at the 1974 British Commonwealth Games
Athletes (track and field) at the 1978 Commonwealth Games
Athletes (track and field) at the 1982 Commonwealth Games
World Athletics Championships athletes for Great Britain
Medallists at the 1982 Commonwealth Games